The Turda Arena is a multi-purpose arena currently under construction in Turda, Romania.

References
  

Indoor arenas under construction in Romania  
Turda 
Handball venues in Romania 
Indoor arenas in Romania
Sports venues in Romania 
Music venues in Romania
Sport in Cluj County